The men's 60 kg judo competition at the 2016 Summer Paralympics was held on 8 September 2016 at Carioca Arena 3.

Results

Repechage

References

External links
 

M60
Judo at the Summer Paralympics Men's Extra Lightweight